August Hirsch (4 October 1817, Danzig – 28 January 1894, Berlin) was a German physician and medical historian.

Biography
He practiced in Danzig after studying at Berlin and Leipzig. In recognition of his studies on malarial fever and his work, Handbuch der historisch-geographischen Pathologie, he was in 1863 made professor at Berlin. In 1873, he was a member of the German Cholera Commission, studied the conditions of Posen and West Prussia, and published a report (1874). He studied the plague in Astrakhan in 1879 and 1880, and in the latter year wrote a report to his Government.

Literary works 
 Die grossen Volkskrankheiten des Mittelalters, a revision of Hecker's collected writings, 1865
 Jahresbericht über die Fortschritte und Leistungen der Medizin, with Rudolf Virchow, 1866 et seq.
 Die Meningitis Cerebro-spinalis Epidemica, 1866
 Geschichte der Augenheilkunde, 1877
 Handbuch der historisch-geographischen Pathologie, 3 Vols., 1881-1886
Handbook of Geographical and Historical Pathology, 3 Vols., 1883–1886, trans. by Charles Creighton
 Biographisches Lexikon der hervorragenden Ärzte aller Zeit, editor, 6 Vols., 1884-1888
 Geschichte der medizinischen Wissenschaften in Deutschland, 1893

References

External links 
 

German medical historians
19th-century German physicians
1817 births
1894 deaths
Leipzig University alumni
Humboldt University of Berlin alumni
Academic staff of the Humboldt University of Berlin
German male non-fiction writers